Nightwood is a 1936 novel by American author Djuna Barnes that was first published by publishing house Faber and Faber. It is one of the early prominent novels to portray explicit homosexuality between women, and as such can be considered lesbian literature.

It is also notable for its intense, gothic prose style. The novel employs modernist techniques such as its unusual form or narrative and can be considered metafiction, and it was praised by other modernist authors including T. S. Eliot, who edited the novel, helped publish it, and wrote an introduction included in the 1937 edition published by Harcourt, Brace. As a roman à clef, the novel features a thinly veiled portrait of Barnes in the character of Nora Flood, whereas Nora's lover Robin Vote is a composite of Thelma Wood and the Baroness Elsa von Freytag-Loringhoven, Jenny Petherbridge is Henriette Alice McCrea-Metcalf, and Felix Volkbein is derived from Frederick Philip Grove.

Synopsis

Bow Down
Felix Volkbein is born in early 1880 to Guido and Hedvig Volkbein, a Jew of Italian descent and a Viennese woman of great beauty, respectively. Guido died six months previously, and Hedvig dies too, at the age of forty-five, shortly after giving birth to Felix.

Guido had pretended to be of baronial descent, adapting to Christian customs, but is constantly haunted by his Jewishness. He lives as an outcast. Hedvig is convinced that she is a Baroness by marriage, though. They reside in a house overlooking the Prater in Vienna, filled with ornaments of a false lineage, including paintings of Guido's claimed parents, a coat-of-arms of Guido's own proclamation, and three pianos, upon which Hedvig plays waltzes in a masculine style.

Thirty years later, Felix turns up from nowhere with the paintings of Guido's "parents", which bear an accidental resemblance to the man. His aunt informs him of his presumed baronial heritage, and Felix takes it up readily, along with an obsession for a sort of nobility and royalty. He comes by good money, masters seven languages, and though well-known, is not popular. He is usually seen alone, dressed in part for the evening and in part for the day.

In 1920, he lives in Paris, keeping two servants for their physical resemblances to royalty, insinuating himself among the actresses and circus performers of Europe in their salons, who have taken on titles too, but for different purposes. He finds a sense of peace here.

One of these performers is Frau Mann, a trapeze artist. One night in Berlin, Mann intends to introduce Felix to a Count Onatorio Altamonte, but they walk in on Dr. Matthew O'Connor, an Irishman from San Francisco, presiding as interim host until the Count has appeared. He holds a certain interest in gynecology and considers himself an amusing predicament.

O'Connor speaks about history and legend, on humor, then proceeds, running over Mann's interjection, to describe a former circus performer in the Cirque de Paris, focusing especially on tattoos which O'Connor calls the ameublement of depravity, and which the performer calls beauty. Felix asks O'Connor about Vienna, seeing that the doctor has stolen the show. A young woman in her late twenties doing publicity for the circus comes over; she is Nora Flood. The doctor claims to have helped to bring her into this world.

Felix bursts into laughter at a certain phrase of the doctor's, then finds himself distressed at having done so. The doctor comes and claims not to be or have a variety of things, then finishes off with a sweeping statement about love and lies. He then continues by comparing the Protestant and the Catholic churches and their methods of storytelling, and their effects.

He moves on to sorrow, after a chide from Nora, then describes a memory of being in a town under bombardment. He had rushed for the cellar, and inside was an old Breton woman, her cow, and a Dubliner praying. Then, under a flash of lightning, he saw that the cow had tears all over her eyes, and he began to talk to the cow. Then comes an aside recalling an encounter with a headsman.

Suddenly, the Count appears with a young girl and tells them all to go, which Matthew says, after the trio are in a cab, is because the Count thinks that he has had "his last erection." Frau Mann bids them go for drinks, and then Felix disembarks. It is snowing.

In Heinrich's, Matthew says that Felix reminds him of a Mme. Basquette, who was "damned from the waist down", without legs. She had wheeled herself around the Pyrenees on a board. Then one day a sailor saw her, wanted her, and raped her. When he was done, he put her down five miles outside of town. She had to wheel herself back into town, crying all the while.

Then Matthew describes his parents and what they looked like. Frau Mann mentions an album of her own, falls asleep, and then the doctor leaves, foisting the bill upon her.

La Somnambule
Matthew lives on the rue Servandoni, close to the church of Saint-Sulpice, and frequents the neighborhood place, its environs, and a local café. He is often seen walking alone, going to Mass, where he uses the holy water liberally, and sometimes, late at night, before entering the cafe, gazing up at the towers of the church and the fountain in the place.

Now, a few weeks after the Berlin encounter, he brings Felix to the cafe. Felix considers Matthew a liar in behavior. Matthew talks about Jews and the Irish, moving from knowledge to societal problems in a medical metaphor. Then grief and laughter, denying that he is neurasthenic, and waiting. Felix muses about beverages unique to cities. An employee from a local hotel approaches the doctor regarding a lady who has fainted. Matthew tells Felix to pay the bill and to follow him, which Felix does. They go upstairs to a room full of a variety of plants surrounding a bed, upon which lies a young woman.

The woman is disheveled, has a scent approaching fungi, and her skin resembles flora. She seems to evoke the somnambule and the paintings of Henri Rousseau. Felix retreats for propriety and Matthew, who happens to be an unlicensed doctor, rouses the woman. The woman tries to rise, but falls back onto the bed. Felix then sees Matthew make a series of dissembling movements with his hands; this is to embellish his face with perfume, powder, and rouge. Matthew, thinking himself unobserved, pockets a hundred-franc note. Felix decides to continue to like the doctor, and to cover him. Felix turns to see the girl sitting up in bed; she recognizes the doctor, but struggles to identify him until the doctor tells her where she is. Looking at her, Felix feels something along the lines of that the woman who presents herself as a picture is dangerous; one sometimes meets a woman who is beast turning human, whose every movement is reduced to images, and who is the infected carrier of the past. He feels as if the girl is the converging halves of a broken fate, and then she dismisses them.

The doctor, asking a bystander for her name, finds it to be Robin Vote, then returns to the café with Felix. He asks Felix about women and marriage; Felix wishes for a son, born of an American woman, who feels about the past the same way he does. The doctor goes on about nobility, the divine right of kings, and blind loyalty. Felix responds that to pay homage to the past is also to acknowledge the future—that is why he must have a son. The doctor critiques aristocracy, which Felix chalks up to his Americanism. Matthew retorts that his Americanism causes him to believe anything, then drinks to Robin as the café closes up shop.

Felix calls for the next four days on Robin to find that she is not in her room. On the fifth, he runs into her on the street, and they walk towards the Jardin du Luxembourg, Felix talking about himself, Robin silent. She is gracious but fading, her smile a little bitter, and her presence, to Felix, painful but a happiness.

They spend much time in museums in the days following, and Felix is surprised to learn that Robin has a taste not just for the excellent but also for the debased and decadent. Her sense of touch seems to be acute, and her hands are sensual. She dresses atemporally but not contemporaneously. His love for her seems fated, and she agrees to marry him.

He takes her to Vienna, showing her all the historic buildings, but is only capable of repeating what he has read about them. He speaks to her in German; saying that life is eternal, and its beauty lies in that fact.

In their hotel that night, Robin opens the window while Felix speaks of history, and Felix, looking at Robin, sees that she is insufficient for his hopes. Returning to Paris, he sees Robin as an enigma, but places his faith in her Christian proclivities, though her attention seems to be taken by something not yet extant. Felix tries to sway her to his chosen destiny, but continuously fails.

Robin becomes pregnant and takes to wandering to other cities alone for long lengths of time, having become aware of some empty space in herself. Then she takes to Catholicism, praying in many churches, thinking of her son's purpose, of the Emperor, and of many historical and fictional women. She does not pray for damnation or forgiveness, but outlines her predicament.

Felix returns that night to find Robin having falling asleep reading the memoirs of the Marquis de Sade, one line being underlined. He asks her what is wrong; they are unable to speak to one another. That night, she gives birth to a small and sad boy. Felix finds her one night seemingly about to smash their son upon the ground, but then she brings him down. Robin takes to wandering again, and is almost never home. One night, they have a confrontation about how Robin did not want their son, and Robin leaves Paris for a few months, reappearing later with Nora Flood, and unwilling to explain what she has been up to. The doctor says that she has been in America.

Night Watch
Nora Flood is introduced as a native of western America, Christian by temperament, and proprietor of a salon in which outcasts of all sorts gathered. She loves widely, and gives herself up for everyone. She appears to constantly record some sort of music, and her eyes unconsciously augment what she sees with her own unconscious terms. She lacks humor, and lacks ignominy, which draws people to her and frightens them. The world to her appears a curiosity, with her outside it, preoccupied otherwise, until she meets Robin.

In the fall of 1923, she meets Robin at a circus in New York, and after one of the lionesses in the pit takes a swipe at Robin, leave together at Robin's behest. They begin their relationship then, living together at Nora's apartment until midwinter, traveling across Europe until reaching Paris, where Nora buys an apartment on the rue du Cherche-Midi which Robin has chosen. They evolve such that Nora comes to be alone in the apartment with knickknacks and other objects, reminders of their relationship, for most of the time. Robin is now beyond simple or conventional description, and has molded Nora to her purposes. Nora begins to dream of Robin in danger, and of taking Robin's body down into the earth with her.

When they are together, though, Robin sings strange songs in many languages which Nora occasionally tries to emulate, but haltingly, and which Nora occasionally interrupts with questions. The singing persists, and Nora comes to the conclusion that the only way to keep Robin for herself is through death.

They stay together for years, and as time goes on, Robin's departures increase in frequency. Nora would track Robin's preparations for departure by the sounds of her dressing, and when Robin leaves, she tells Nora not to wait for her. At first, Nora goes with Robin, but as Nora begins to feel intrusive or forgotten, Nora stays home. She longs for Robin desperately, though, and then goes out where she might not see Robin.

Matthew, seeing Nora walking, notes her as a religious woman without the refuge of the faith, looking for Robin, who she is afraid to find. Nora searches for not Robin, but traces of her presence. Then, returning home, an interminable night begins. She becomes agitatated, sleeps and wakes again, then finally dreams a dream which had previously been incomplete in some way.

In this dream, Nora sees herself in her grandmother's room. Looking down, she sees Robin lying on the floor far below, and calls to her, but the louder she calls, the farther away the floor goes. The structure of the dream gives her grandmother's room, though the opposite of any room associated with said grandmother outside dreams, the presence of her grandmother. She remembers happening upon her cross-dressed grandmother as a child, which now indicates to Nora some sort of disfigurement and eternalization of Robin.

Nora wakes, and resumes walking, and looks out into the garden, seeing the light of Robin's eyes emerge from shadow, gazes at her. Nora sees now that Robin is with another woman, falls to her knees, and gasps.

"The Squatter"
Jenny Petherbridge is a middle-aged widow married four times. Her body does not as a whole go together, and she looks old, though she gives the impression of being pregnant. She dislikes dressing well, and likes small jade or ivory elephants for their luck. She fills her house with accouterments of other people's lives—she wears someone else's marriage ring, keeps other people's books, and lives among the things as a visitor. She moves about her house nervously, and speaks in anecdotes and what seem not to be her words.

She has an obsession with theater, gives the impression of erudition, though she has read sparely, and absorbs other people's facts in her passion to be a person to such a degree that she cannot think for herself. Her actions and words are overwrought. This is particularly true for love—she cannot fall in love herself, but acts what she knows of it, using Robin and Nora as an example—she had met Robin, and through Robin, knew of Nora, in 1927, and then took their love for her own.

In subsequent meetings with Robin, Jenny is always early and Robin late. Jenny fears meeting Nora, and so they meet in expensive restaurants, like the Ambassadeurs, Jenny having the money.

They meet once at the opera, where Jenny spies the doctor, and knowing of his propensity for gossip, implies that this was her first encounter with Robin. Jenny, going home with Robin and the doctor, finds actresses waiting. Fates are discussed, palms read, and mention of Robin's special circumstances are made, whereupon Jenny calls for a carriage ride, confusing the doctor. Three carriages appear; they have been on call for an hour. Jenny, Robin, the doctor, a young Englishwomen of whom Jenny is jealous, and a small girl (Sylvia) board the first carriage, and they go off.

The doctor begins musing about his childhood, when his father did not love him. The doctor had joined the army in an effort to engender that love, and then his father, not wishing to see his son killed, seeks love and reconciliation, which is had. Jenny begins to cry. The doctor asks why lesbianism must exist with its anguish and motherhood, and argues with Jenny over love; Robin calls out Jenny for talking while knowing nothing. Jenny strikes Robin repeatedly, drawing blood. Sylvia cries out to let her go, the carriage arrives at Nora and Robin's apartment, Robin leaves, followed by Jenny.

Shortly afterwards, Nora and Robin separate; after that, Robin and Jenny leave for America.

Watchman, What of the Night?
Nora, in the middle of the night, seeks the doctor in his apartment to ask about the night. His apartment is cluttered with books, medical instruments, and women's clothing; the room seems muscular though degraded. She comes upon the doctor rouged, in a women's nightgown, and otherwise made up; upon realizing Nora’s presence, the doctor takes off his wig and hides most of himself under the sheets. Nora thinks about gowns, and notes how the night transforms a person's identity, even when the person is asleep, and then the doctor—Matthew Mighty-grain-of-salt-Dante O’Connor—relates how the day and night are connected through their division. Nights of one place are not that of another, he says, and French nights are sought by every country. The difference there is that the French think of night and day as continuous, that they might revolve about the Great Enigma, which cannot be perceived head-on.

The doctor rants about life for a bit, then asks Nora to think of the night and day as the French do, and also to be like them in more general aspects. He returns to night and day, saying that Americans separate the two for fear of mystery and indignity. He cries about anguish, causing Nora to despair about Robin and being happy. Then he goes on about sleepers and history and dreams, and transformations then, particularly with sleepwalking. We do a great many things in sleep, according to him, much of which requires guilty immunity. It brings out baser aspects of the self, and for that the night and dreams trouble us. He then implies that Robin and Nora will be bound forever.

He criticizes Anglo-Saxons for washing sin away with water, for it only cleanses sin itself; Europeans bathe in dust, and with disorder holding a balance. The French do not reject their sin as Americans do, and are wise for it; Americans wash away their identity this way. Nora asks how the doctor stands such a price for his wisdom, and receives no straight answer.

The doctor reveals that he lost his left kidney fighting for France in the war, and hates it, though he'd do it again in a pinch. He explores how he might have been a girl in the past, or in past lives, and how that residual memory haunts him. He wishes terribly for children and knitting—to cook for a man and give him children.  Then he goes on about cruising, of lesbianism, and birth. Nora tries to interrupt to get her questions answered, to no avail. The doctor comes to Jenny, and describes her character as he perceives it. He sees her very clearly. He describes seeing her first see Robin at the Opera, then showing Rigoletto, and knowing that this spelled trouble. He had taken them to a Catholic church. He states that Jenny and Robin and Nora will be entangled forever—Nora and Robin, who should have been together, and Jenny, snatching at the bits left over. He goes off on Jenny again to Nora.

Then he recounts the house-carriage sequence from his perspective. He saw how Jenny is desperate for Robin, and perused Jenny's collection with scorn. He thought of how things are well, then remembered life and death, and mourned for his spirit and animals about to be birthed. Then he saw the English girl pleased and frightened, the child—Sylvia—frightened, sitting still but running. Then he saw Jenny shaking, and Robin bleeding. He screamed, and thought how Nora would leave Robin someday, but they should be connected forever.

Where the Tree Falls
Felix, having resigned from the bank, has traveled to many countries, still fascinated with the past. Occasionally, he writes to the press about a noble, but is never published. He also writes to noble houses, but is never replied to. Now he prepares papers for the Pope, for his child seems to be born to holy decay.

His son Guido is mentally deficient, emotionally excessive, obsessed with death, very short, bespectacled, and clumsy. Guido wishes to enter the church; Felix had been initially surprised at this, but then accepts his son and gives up his wishes. Felix then facilitates Guido's desires as much as he can, researching litanies and monasteries and even writing to the Pope about difference in religious practice among the French and the Italians, and their relationship to time. He receives no reply, and decides to move to Vienna, but not before looking for the doctor.

He catches the doctor on the way to the café after attending a funeral of a Kabyle man of whom he was fond. Before the doctor notices him, he sees the doctor moving as if he were much older than he was. Seeing Felix, the doctor greets him, accepts an invitation to dinner in the Bois. On the way there, the doctor dreams of what he shall have for dinner—poverty has restricted his diet, and all he can think of are drinks evoking ancestral memory—before realizing that Felix is speaking to him of Robin. Felix says that his impression of her was not her, and even with others’ impressions, his confusion only grew. The doctor observes that Felix's devotion to the past is akin to a child's drawing. They continue discussing Robin and habits as identity, until they arrive at the restaurant, when Felix asks why Robin married him in the first place, and tells the doctor that Jenny has visited him. She had spoken of the doctor, referencing his daily habits and practices as an abortionist, and was there ostensibly to buy a painting of Felix's grandmother, with which he could not part. She also spoke of Robin, and how she could not understand her at all, extraordinary as she was, and also that Robin tends to dote upon her pets before she neglects them and leaves them to die. Then she shifted to Sylvia, who apparently had a special relationship with Robin, but after Sylvia returned from the holidays, Robin appeared not to remember her at all, which devastated Sylvia.

The doctor and Felix then discuss Guido, and him in relation to Robin, and destiny and history of a person and seeking those out in the abstract. The doctor comforts and advises Felix over Guido: he says that Guido is blessed, unlike most people, and is really what Felix has been looking for. They then briefly discuss Robin—she is in America, but struggling with remembering herself, and estranged from life.

Some time later, Felix, Guido, and Frau Mann enter Vienna, patronizing many cafés. Felix tends to call for militaristic and nationalistic German music. One evening, he spies someone who appears to be Grand Duke Alexander, and, despite self-restraint, bows to him, and retreats to his carriage, rubbing oil into Guido's hands.

Go Down, Matthew

The doctor comes into Nora's apartment late one afternoon to find her writing a letter. He is exasperated, thinking that Nora ought to give Robin a rest by now. Nora is anxious; they proceed to talk at each other for a long time.

The doctor speaks of Jenny's vacillation between past and present, nostalgia, and the self-destructive effects of Nora's idolization of Robin. He moves around life and death and time. He speaks of heartbreak, and advises Nora to be careless with how she conducts her relationships. She is experiencing an “inbreeding of pain”, he says, and follows up with an anecdote about happening upon a sexual encounter between a prostitute and her client under London Bridge. Prostitutes try to recall their youth or of better days, he says. Then he jumps to Paris, and recalls a winter night when he found the Church of Saint-Merri a refuge to be alone and to think. He had walked straight up to the purgatory box to demonstrate his sins, and then retreated to a corner to converse with his penis—Tiny O’Toole—and question his sexuality before the Lord. He cried, and then left, looking at the stars.

During all this time, Nora remains adamant that she must continue writing to Robin, occasionally slipping in a sentence or two between the doctor's rants. She, realizing her conflation of identity with Robin's, grows despondent, and revisits her memories with Robin. She tells of her misery.

After the doctor's Paris anecdote, Nora questions why she speaks to him, childlike that he is. The doctor picks up on the line of children, telling of a young tenor from Beirut and how he abandoned his sick son to watch the fleet in Venice. He pauses, then waxes about Robin and people's attraction to her, but Nora is not paying attention, being despondent again. She questions love, and then laments her tendency to seek out evil and degradation. She wanted power, and chose a girl resembling a boy. The doctor replies by stating that he is a liar because of people like Nora now—in pain, begging for distraction, for him to say something. As for Nora's heartbreak, it is not special; it is part of age. She has erred in attempting to know the unknowable Robin.

Nora has only ever loved Robin, and will never love anyone else the same way. The doctor and Nora talk more about love, degradation, and suffering. They pass through Robin and Nora's love to gender and codependency. Matthew calls out Nora's repeated misplaced faith, and Nora tells of when she visited Jenny the night after the fateful one in the earlier chapters. She knew Jenny to be Robin's mistress by the presence of a doll—Robin had given Nora one herself—and then Jenny makes great affectations, after which Nora realizes the hopelessness of her situation. The doll was hurting her because of what it symbolized—children of women. Nora went home afterwards and confronted Robin.

After an interlude of notes on gender and love, Nora recalls a night in Montparnasse where she had been called to pick up Robin, who was too drunk to get home. Robin had, even as she was being groped by a police officer, kept up a continuous stream of insults at Nora. After a struggle to get her into bed, where she falls asleep after eating eggs, Nora wishes that Robin should die so that she could be hers forever. Nora tells Matthew how she has perceived Robin incorrectly all this time, and then how she has been mad ever since she saw Robin wake afterwards, and begs Matthew to say something.

Matthew begs Nora to stop screaming, and decries her attempts to possess and repossess Robin. Robin had put Nora away by making her her Madonna. Nora describes examples of Robin's control over her connections to other people, and how, when Nora came in late one night, Robin had broken the doll she had given Nora on the floor. They discuss dolls, devils, death, and dreams. Nora asks the doctor to tell Robin of her desire for her; the doctor refuses. They talk more of Robin, sexuality, gender identity, and unhealthy love. After a bit, the doctor complains about how Nora's heartbreak has damaged him, and how she acts because of it, as if her grief was all there was. He is not happy, but Nora uses him as a crutch. Nora tells him to listen to her. She mentions Robin in relation to sleep and control. Nora had loved her, and made Robin hate her for it, because Robin could not escape Nora.

After Robin had left with Jenny for America, Nora searched spiritually for Robin in Mediterranean ports, in places she had been, doing what she did to attempt to understand her. She tried to sleep with someone else to restart her relationship with Robin, but could not carry it through. Then, in a room off of a Neapolitan alley, she saw a girl sitting in a chair before a bed next to a gaudy altar, and, looking from the girl to the Madonna on the wall, she realized that that was all she had been to Robin—a fixed dismay. She and Robin should have shed their lives to break down to their love. Matthew, confused and shocked, leaves.

The doctor goes to his usual café, where the clientele, knowing that he is drunk, wait for the doctor to speak. He does, and after a few topics, an unfrocked priest, a friend of the doctor's, invites him for a drink, and the doctor does. The priest asks him if he were ever really married. The doctor says that he said that he was, then goes on about myths and imagination and hypotheticals. The priest asks what is in that, and gets a general flood of insults in return, cursing, at the end, Nora and Jenny. He complains about them and Felix, and degenerates into a sad rant about his sadness and misery. Then he tells of when he saw a medicine man doing parlor tricks before beheading a boy, how a watching priest laughed then. He also speaks of when Catherine the Great sent for him to bleed her, upon which the unfrocked priest reproaches him to remember his century. He returns to complaining about Jenny, Robin, and Nora, and breaks down, asking the audience to let him go, the end now nothing but wrath and weeping.

The Possessed
The book circles back to when Robin and Jenny left for America. When they arrived in New York together, Robin seemed distracted, wandering about the country, entering many churches. Jenny follows close behind, noticing Robin's approaches to animalistic behavior and becoming all the more hysterical for it.

Now, Robin begins to circle closer to Nora's country—the west—sleeping in the woods, until she reaches the chapel on Nora's grounds, where she brings some of her things. She goes no further, and one night she wakes up to hear Nora's dog barking.

Nora, having since returned from Europe, notices the same barking, lets out the dog, and follows him until she sees the chapel, whereupon she begins to run, cursing and crying, until she plunges into the jamb of the door.

Inside, Robin stands before a contrived altar, and when Nora hits the jamb, she goes down before the dog, dragging her knees and swinging her head against the dog's. The dog, frightened, tries to escape, but is cornered. He grows more and more agitated, biting at Robin, and then Robin begins to bark too, to which the dog cries, and their affects decrease in intensity until Robin lies out, weeping, and the dog too lies down, head on Robin's knees.

Conception
Barnes worked on Nightwood, then known as Bow Down, in the summer of 1932, while at Peggy Guggenheim's country manor, Hayford Hall, in Devonshire. Author Charles Henri Ford also typed part of an early version of the manuscript for Barnes while she was in Tangiers with him in 1932. Emily Coleman heard Barnes read portions of the draft at Hayford Hall that summer and became deeply involved in helping Barnes make major revisions to the manuscript in 1934–1935, as she struggled to find a publisher. In 1935–1936, Coleman persistently contacted T. S. Eliot, then an editor at Faber and Faber, to get his support to publish the novel. It was published later in 1936, after Barnes and Coleman accepted Eliot's further suggested revisions.

Reception and critical analysis
Roger Austen notes that "the best known, most deeply felt, and generally best written expatriate novel of the 1930s dealing with gay themes was Djuna Barnes' Nightwood". Austen goes on to advance the notion that Barnes's depiction of Dr. O'Connor probably confounded a number of American readers because he was neither a "scamp or a monster" nor does he pay a "suitable penalty" for leading a "life of depravity".

Because of concerns about censorship, Eliot edited Nightwood to soften some language relating to sexuality and religion. An edition restoring these changes, edited by Cheryl J. Plumb, was published by Dalkey Archive Press in 1995. Catherine Hollis also argues that Barnes originally intended that the chapter "Night Watch" should be immediately followed by "Watchman, What of the Night?", and then "The Squatter".

Dylan Thomas described Nightwood as "one of the three great prose books ever written by a woman", while William S. Burroughs called it "one of the great books of the twentieth century". It was number 12 on a list of the top 100 gay and lesbian novels compiled by The Publishing Triangle in 1999.

Anthony Slide, a modern scholar, lists Nightwood as an example of one of the most well-known gay novels of the first half of the 20th century in the English language, alongside Gore Vidal's The City and the Pillar, Carson McCullers' Reflections in a Golden Eye, and Truman Capote's Other Voices, Other Rooms.

References

Works cited

1936 American novels
Novels with lesbian themes
Faber and Faber books
1930s LGBT novels
Roman à clef novels